Hickmanapis is a genus of Australian araneomorph spiders in the family Anapidae, first described by Norman I. Platnick & Raymond Robert Forster in 1989.  it contains only two species.

References

Anapidae
Araneomorphae genera
Spiders of Australia
Taxa named by Raymond Robert Forster